Richard J. Castillo (born October 11, 1989) is a Venezuelan professional baseball pitcher who plays for the Gary SouthShore RailCats. He also played for the Spain national baseball team in the 2013 World Baseball Classic.

Castillo elected free agency from the Colorado Rockies organization on November 6, 2015.

References

External links

1989 births
Baseball pitchers
Living people
2013 World Baseball Classic players
Palm Beach Cardinals players
Quad Cities River Bandits players
Springfield Cardinals players
Memphis Redbirds players
Tulsa Drillers players
Cardenales de Lara players
Venezuelan Summer League Cardinals players
Sportspeople from Barquisimeto